The 1928 Boston Red Sox season was the 28th season in the franchise's Major League Baseball history. The Red Sox finished last in the eight-team American League (AL) with a record of 57 wins and 96 losses,  games behind the New York Yankees, who went on to win the 1928 World Series.

Regular season

Season standings

Record vs. opponents

Opening Day lineup

Notable transactions 
 April 25, 1928: Hal Wiltse was traded by the Red Sox to the St. Louis Browns for Wally Gerber.

Roster

Player stats

Batting

Starters by position 
Note: Pos = Position; G = Games played; AB = At bats; H = Hits; Avg. = Batting average; HR = Home runs; RBI = Runs batted in

Other batters 
Note: G = Games played; AB = At bats; H = Hits; Avg. = Batting average; HR = Home runs; RBI = Runs batted in

Pitching

Starting pitchers 
Note: G = Games pitched; IP = Innings pitched; W = Wins; L = Losses; ERA = Earned run average; SO = Strikeouts

Other pitchers 
Note: G = Games pitched; IP = Innings pitched; W = Wins; L = Losses; ERA = Earned run average; SO = Strikeouts

Relief pitchers 
Note: G = Games pitched; W = Wins; L = Losses; SV = Saves; ERA = Earned run average; SO = Strikeouts

Farm system 

Source:

References

External links
1928 Boston Red Sox team page at Baseball Reference
1928 Boston Red Sox season at baseball-almanac.com

Boston Red Sox seasons
Boston Red Sox
Boston Red Sox
1920s in Boston